Wabash may refer to:

Political entities
 Wabash Confederacy, or Wabash Indians, a loose confederacy of 18th century Native Americans

Places in the United States
 Wabash River, in Ohio, Indiana and Illinois
 Wabash Valley, in Illinois and Indiana
 Wabash, Arkansas, an unincorporated community
 Wabash, Indiana, a city
 Wabash County, Illinois
 Wabash Precinct, Wabash County, Illinois
 Wabash County, Indiana
 Wabash, Nebraska, an unincorporated community
 Wabash, Ohio, an unincorporated community
 Wabash, King County, Washington, an unincorporated community
 Wabash, Lewis County, Washington, an unincorporated community
 Wabash, West Virginia, a ghost town
 Wabash township (disambiguation)
 Wabash Formation, a geologic formation in Indiana

Schools
 Wabash College, a college in Crawfordsville, Indiana
 Wabash Valley College, a college in Mount Carmel, Illinois
 Wabash High School, Wabash, Indiana

In transportation
 Wabash Railroad, a former railroad that operated in the Midwestern United States
 Wabash, St. Louis & Pacific Railway Company v. Illinois, an 1886 U.S. Supreme Court case
 Wabash Avenue (disambiguation)
 Wabash Bridge (disambiguation)
 Wabash Combination Depot-Moravia, Moravia, Iowa, a historic train station on the National Register of Historic Places
 Wabash Railroad Station and Freight House, Columbia, Missouri, on the National Register of Historic Places
 Wabash Tunnel, a former railway tunnel, and current automobile tunnel 
 Wabash National, a manufacturer of trailers and transportation equipment

Other uses
 Battle of the Wabash (disambiguation), several battles
 USS Wabash, multiple ships
 Wabash Trail (disambiguation)
 2453 Wabash, an asteroid